Ponderano is a municipality in the province of Biella,  Piedmont, northwestern Italy. Neighbouring comuni include Borriana, Gaglianico, Mongrando, Occhieppo Inferiore and Sandigliano.

References

Cities and towns in Piedmont